The Mt. Moriah Wilderness is a  wilderness area in the northern part of the Snake Range of White Pine County, in the eastern section of the state of Nevada in the western United States.

Topography
At  and stretching north and west of the peak is a unique plateau called the Table. Much of the area is composed of limestone and shallow caves are common in the Wilderness.

Archeology
Archaeological sites including caves utilized by Native Americans, pictographs, and lithic scatters are found in the Wilderness.

Vegetation
See: :Category:Flora of the Great Basin
The Mount Moriah Wilderness lies within the Intermountain sagebrush/ponderosa pine ecosystem and vegetation varies with the elevation.  Pinyon pine and juniper dominate the lower slopes, while aspen, mountain mahogany, white and Douglas fir, limber pine, and bristlecone pine are found in the upper elevations.

Wildlife

A variety of wildlife and fish species inhabit the Mt. Moriah Wilderness.  The majority of the area is summer range for mule deer, although some of the lower elevation benches and riparian areas are used year-round.  Rocky Mountain bighorn sheep can be found throughout the year in the area, as well as blue grouse, sage grouse, and chukar.  Rainbow trout, brook trout, and the unique Bonneville cutthroat trout are found in the area's perennial streams, including Hampton Creek, Hendry's Creek, and Smith Creek.

See also
 Nevada Wilderness Areas
 List of wilderness areas in Nevada
 List of U.S. Wilderness Areas
 Wilderness Act

References

External links
 Humboldt-Toiyabe National Forest:  official Mount Moriah Wilderness website
 Friends of Nevada Wilderness: Mt. Moriah Wilderness
 Mt. Moriah Wilderness - Wilderness Connect
 GORP: Mt. Moriah Wilderness
 Trails.com: Nevada Hikes - Mount Moriah
 official Humboldt-Toiyabe National Forest website
 National Atlas: Map of Humboldt-Toiyabe National Forest

Moriah Wilderness
Moriah Wilderness
Moriah Wilderness
Moriah Wilderness
Moriah Wilderness